The second season of The Masked Singer Brasil  premiered on January 23, 2022, on TV Globo and concluded on April 24, 2022.

Hosts and panelists 
Singer Ivete Sangalo returns as host while Priscilla Alcantara (the previous seasons winner) serves as a backstage interviewer. The panelists include actor Rodrigo Lombardi, actress Taís Araújo and comedian Eduardo Sterblitch in addition comedian Tatá Werneck joined the panel for the second season, replacing Simone Mendes.

Guest panelists

Contestants

Future Appearances

After this season, in 2023, Aline Wirley (Caranguejo) and MC Guimê (Lampião, from Lampião & Maria Bonita) appeared in Big Brother Brasil 23. Aline remains in the competition, while Guimê was expelled.

Episodes

Week 1 (January 23)

Week 2 (January 30)

Week 3 (February 6)

Week 4 (February 13)

Week 5 (February 27)

Week 6 (March 6)

Week 7 (March 13)

Week 8 (March 20)

 Episode 8 was a TV Globo soap opera special, all performances were based on songs from their soundtrack.

Week 9 (March 27)

Week 10 (April 3)

Week 11 (April 10)

Week 12 (April 17)

Week 13 (April 24) - Finale

Ratings and reception

Brazilian ratings
All numbers are in points and provided by Kantar Ibope Media.

Notes

References 

The Masked Singer Brasil
Masked Singer Brasil